The Humpty Dumpty Circus is a lost short stop-motion film directed by J. Stuart Blackton and Albert E. Smith, the Anglo-American founders of Vitagraph Studios. There are no known surviving copies.

Albert E. Smith claimed in his 1952 book Two reels and a crank: "I used my little daughter's set of wooden circus performers and animals, whose movable joints enabled us to place them in balanced positions. It was a tedious process inasmuch as the movement could be achieved only by photographing separately each change of position. I suggested we obtain a patent on the process; Blackton felt it wasn't important enough. However, others quickly borrowed the technique, improving on it greatly."

The Moving Picture World. Vol. 3. No. 18 reviewed the 885 feet short in October 1908: "It opens with a crowd of children leaving school and marching through the streets to the "Humpty Dumpty Circus." We see them crowd into the tent and at the end of each act they vociferously applaud the performers These are the little wooden toys that are familiar to all, and which are made to perform all the usual acrobatic stunts of the circus performer in a remarkably realistic manner. Some of the scenes are really comical and it is hard to believe that the elephants and donkeys are not alive." Followed by an explanation of how the photographer worked for several months on the negative. Cinematographer F. Dobson was said to be "an adept at this kind of work".

The used toy set was most likely the popular Humpty Dumpty Circus produced by Schoenhut Piano Company from 1903 to 1935 (in various styles). Images that have been thought to be stills from the film may well be pictures of the popular toy set.

The short has been thought to have been the first film to use the stop-motion technique, based on an estimated release date of 1897 or 1898. This early release date, the use of stop-motion animation and even the existence of the film have been doubted as no proper documentation is known.

Another lost film that probably featured animated dolls entitled The Humpty Dumpty Circus was released in October 1914. It was made by stop motion pioneer Arthur Melbourne-Cooper.

References

External links
 
 Information on bcdb.com
  2015 Homage of the film on YouTube

American animated short films
Films directed by J. Stuart Blackton
Vitagraph Studios short films
Lost animated films
American silent short films
Lost American films
Circus films
American black-and-white films
1900s American films